Nepalgrella is a genus of harvestmen in the family Sclerosomatidae from Nepal.

Species
 Nepalgrella kortaliensis J. Martens, 1987
 Nepalgrella yamputhini J. Martens, 1987

References

Harvestmen
Harvestman genera